Ram Raheem  is a 1974 Indian Telugu-language drama film, produced by K. R. V. Prasad Rao under the Raja Lakshmi Combines banner and directed by B. A. Subba Rao. It stars Nandamuri Balakrishna, Nandamuri Harikrishna  and music composed by S. Rajeswara Rao.

Plot
The film is based on friendship that is beyond caste creed and religion. It also proclaims A true friend in need is a friend indeed. Ram & Rahim are besties studying in the same school. Rajaiah the father of Ram is a truck driver who serves as an honorable-seeming hoodlum Jagan Mohan Rao. Since Raiyah is a vice and worry-free his family leads a penniless life. Thus, his wife Lakshmi works as a maid in a few houses for their survival. However, Rajaiah torments them and dissipates strive of Lakshmi. All the time, Rahim support and shields Ram. He is the son of Inspector Khan one that lives mirthfully which vexes Ram to hit against his own. Near their school, the duo maintains cordial relations with a beggar Sivaram. As worse comes and completely stuck under the furnace of hardship Lakshmi attempts suicide. Ram & Rahim rescue her and words to turn the family.

During that plight, Ram quits his education and pulls a rickshaw for his livelihood. Besides, Shyam the son of a millionaire loves Ram's sibling Radha. Here, Ram & Rahim play an act and get approval for their wedding. Later, Shyam realizes the foster of his parents and moves to seek the whereabouts of his biological. But accidentally, goes into the clutches of Jagan Mohan Rao's gang. On the occasion of their school function, Sivaram revolts against Jagan Mohan Rao but he is dumped as insane. Accordingly, Ram & Rahim seeks his reality when Sivaram spins back. Once, he is a tycoon whose son is abducted by Jagan Mohan Rao. In turn, he grabbed his wealth and also vanished the boy. Now Ram & Rahim is aware of Shyam's missing case, and start digging when they get the knowledge that he is the son of Sivaram. As it happens, the Police Department utilizes Ram & Rahim as weapons and schemes to catch hold of gangsters. Meanwhile, Jagan Mohan Rao entices Radha, nabs, and attempts to molest her. Spotting it Rajaiah reforms and guards her. At last, Ram & Rahim seizes the baddies and reunion, everyone. Finally, the movie ends on a happy note with the government rewarding them and providing job opportunities after the complication of their education.

Cast

Nandamuri Balakrishna as Ram
Nandamuri Harikrishna as Raheem
Chandra Mohan as Shyam
Relangi as Shyam's father
Dhulipala as Shivaram
Satyanarayana as Rajaiah
Allu Ramalingaiyah as teacher
Prabhakar Reddy as Inspector Khan
Thyagaraju as Kabuliwala
Sakshi Ranga Rao as a clerk
Ch. Krishna Murthy as Jagan Mohan Rao
Chitti Babu 
Sowcar Janaki as Lakshmi
Roja Ramani as Radha
Nirmalamma as Ram's grandmother

Soundtrack

Music composed by S. Rajeswara Rao. Music released on EMI Columbia Audio Company.

References

1970s Telugu-language films
Indian drama films
Films scored by S. Rajeswara Rao
Films directed by B. A. Subba Rao